Neostapfiella is a genus of Madagascan plants in the grass family.

 Species
 Neostapfiella chloridiantha A.Camus
 Neostapfiella humbertiana A.Camus
 Neostapfiella perrieri A.Camus

References

Chloridoideae
Poaceae genera
Endemic flora of Madagascar
Taxa named by Aimée Antoinette Camus